Robert Arthur Seguso (born May 1, 1963) is a former professional tennis player from the United States. A doubles specialist, he won four Grand Slam men's doubles titles (two Wimbledon, one French Open and one US Open). He also won the men's doubles gold medal at the 1988 Olympic Games in Seoul, partnering Ken Flach. Seguso reached the world no. 1 doubles ranking in 1985. He won a total of 29 career doubles titles between 1984 and 1991.

Seguso played doubles with Flach on the U.S. Davis Cup team from 1985 to 1991, compiling a 10–2 record. He was also a member of the U.S. team which won the World Team Cup in 1985.

Before turning professional, Seguso played tennis for Southern Illinois University-Edwardsville, where he was an NCAA Division II singles finalist in 1982 and Division I doubles finalist in 1983.

Seguso married the Canadian tennis player Carling Bassett in 1987. The couple have five children – sons Holden John (born in 1988) and Ridley Jack (1991), and daughters Carling Junior (1992), Lennon Shy and Theodora.

Grand Slams finals

Doubles (4 titles, 2 runner-ups)

Career finals

Doubles (29 titles, 20 runner-ups)

Doubles performance timeline

References

External links 
 
 
 

American male tennis players
American people of Italian descent
French Open champions
Olympic gold medalists for the United States in tennis
Sportspeople from Minneapolis
SIU Edwardsville Cougars men's tennis players
Tennis people from Minnesota
Tennis players at the 1988 Summer Olympics
US Open (tennis) champions
Wimbledon champions
1963 births
Living people
Grand Slam (tennis) champions in men's doubles
Sportspeople from Boca Raton, Florida
Medalists at the 1988 Summer Olympics
ATP number 1 ranked doubles tennis players